Fashion Walk is a shopping centre in Causeway Bay, Hong Kong near Causeway Bay station. The mall is bounded by Great George, Paterson, Kingston and Cleveland streets.

See also

 List of shopping centres in Hong Kong

References

External links
 
 

Causeway Bay
Shopping centres in Hong Kong